Villaggio is an Italian word meaning "village". It may refer to:

Places

Italy 
Villaggio Coppola, a civil parish of Castel Volturno (CE), Campania
Villaggio Olimpico (Olympic Village), a quarter of Rome
Pergusa (also named Villaggio Pergusa), a civil parish of Enna, Sicily
Villaggio del Pescatore (slv: Ribiško Naselje), a civil parish of Duino-Aurisina (TS), Friuli-Venezia Giulia

Qatar 
Villaggio Mall, a shopping mall in Doha

United States 
Villaggio Italia Resort, an Italian resort in the town of Haines Falls, on the Catskill Mountains, State of New York

People
Paolo Villaggio (1932–2017), Italian actor, writer, director and comedian

Other
Il sabato del villaggio, a poetry of Giacomo Leopardi

See also